Kacper Skwierczyński (born 11 January 2003) is a Polish professional footballer who plays as a winger for Ruch Chorzów.

Club career

Legia Warsaw 
Kacper Skwierczyński made his professional debut for Legia Warsaw on the 22 September 2021, coming on as a half-time substitute for Yuri Ribeiro during a 3–1 away cup win against Wigry Suwałki.

A few months later, he played his first European game, coming on as a substitute during the 0–1 UEFA Europa League loss at home to Spartak Moscow on 9 December 2021.

Ruch Chorzów 
Having only played for Legia's reserve side since his European debut, on 3 January 2023 Skwierczyński signed a two-and-a-half-year contract with I liga club Ruch Chorzów.

References

External links

2003 births
Living people
Polish footballers
Association football midfielders
People from Siedlce
Legia Warsaw II players
Legia Warsaw players
Ruch Chorzów players
III liga players